Chondrodendron is a genus of flowering plants belonging to the family Menispermaceae.

Its native range is Central & Southern Tropical America.

Species:

Chondrodendron microphyllum 
Chondrodendron platyphyllum 
Chondrodendron tomentosum

References

Menispermaceae
Menispermaceae genera